Aleksandr Yevgenyevich Popkov (born 27 December 1994) is a Russian swimmer. He represented his country at the 2016 Summer Olympics.

References

External links
 

1994 births
Living people
Russian male swimmers
Male butterfly swimmers
Russian male freestyle swimmers
Swimmers at the 2016 Summer Olympics
Olympic swimmers of Russia
Medalists at the FINA World Swimming Championships (25 m)
World Aquatics Championships medalists in swimming